Bogomil Dyakov (born 12 April 1984) is a former Bulgarian professional footballer who played as a defender.

Career

Early career
Dyakov came through the youth ranks at Levski Sofia. In his time at the club he made eleven first team appearances in the league. He made his debut during the 2001–02 season, but struggled to get into the first team and spent loan spells at Pirin Blagoevgrad and Rodopa Smolyan.

In June 2005, Dyakov returned to Levski Sofia. He made 10 appearances and collected his first A PFG title winner's medal at the end of the 2005–06 season. In the 2006 Summer transfer window he was loaned out again to Rodopa Smolyan.

Spartak Varna
On 18 December 2006, Dyakov joined Spartak Varna on a permanent basis.

Slavia Sofia
On 1 June 2007, it was officially announced that Dyakov had signed for Slavia Sofia on a long-term deal, for an undisclosed fee. He made his league debut on 12 August 2007 in a 2–0 home win against Beroe Stara Zagora. In November 2010, Dyakov was selected by manager Emil Velev for captain of the team.

In pre-season training for the 2011–12 A PFG season, Dyakov ruptured his anterior cruciate ligament and meniscus, and received surgery. His recovery was said to take up to six months. He made his comeback for Slavia from a serious knee injury on 8 February 2012, playing for 25 minutes in a 2–1 friendly loss against Kolkheti-1913 Poti.

Manager career 
In October 2020, few days after Vitosha Bistritsa exclude their first team from the league, Dyakov announced his retirement from active football and joined CSKA 1948 Academy as head coach of Under 11 team.

Statistics

Honours

Club 
Levski Sofia
 A PFG: 2005–06

References

External links
 Career Statistics at Guardian.co.uk
 Profile at LevskiSofia.info

1984 births
Living people
Bulgarian footballers
First Professional Football League (Bulgaria) players
Second Professional Football League (Bulgaria) players
PFC Levski Sofia players
OFC Pirin Blagoevgrad players
PFC Rodopa Smolyan players
PFC Spartak Varna players
PFC Slavia Sofia players
FC Montana players
PFC Lokomotiv Plovdiv players
PFC Spartak Pleven players
FC Septemvri Sofia players
FC CSKA 1948 Sofia players
FC Vitosha Bistritsa players
Association football defenders
People from Dupnitsa
Sportspeople from Kyustendil Province